Pretty Girl or Pretty Girls may refer to:
 Pretty Girl (EP), a 2008 EP by Kara, or the title track
 Pretty Girls (album), a 1979 album by Lisa Dal Bello, or the title track
 "Pretty Girl" (Maggie Lindemann song), 2016
 "Pretty Girls" (Britney Spears and Iggy Azalea song), 2015
 "Pretty Girls" (Iyaz song), 2011
 "Pretty Girls" (Wale song), 2009
 "Pretty Girl" (Jon B. song), 1995
 "Pretty Girl", Kanika Kapoor and Ikka Singh, 2018
 "Pretty Girl", 2017 single by Clairo from the 2018 EP Diary 001
 "Pretty Girl", Hayley Kiyoko from the Citrine EP, 2016
 "Pretty Girls", by Little Dragon from the 2014 album Nabuma Rubberband
 "Pretty Girls", by Against Me! from the 2005 album Searching for a Former Clarity
 "Pretty Girls", by Neko Case from the 2002 album Blacklisted
 "Pretty Girl (The Way)", by Sugarcult from the 2001 album Start Static
 "Pretty Girls", by Melissa Manchester from the 1979 album Melissa Manchester
 "Pretty Girl", The Easybeats from the 1967 album The Best of The Easybeats + Pretty Girl

See also
Pretty Girls Make Graves, an American art punk band
Pretty Boys and Pretty Girls (1988 single), single by Book of Love
Pretty Boy (disambiguation)
Prettyman (disambiguation)
Pretty Woman (disambiguation)